The Alfred H. and Sarah Frahm House is a historic house in Fort Calhoun, Nebraska. It was built in 1905 for Alfred H. Frahm, who lived here with his wife, née Sarah Case Beales, and their daughter, Catharine Comly Frahm. It was designed in the Classical Revival style by Fisher and Lawrie, an architectural firm based in Omaha. When Catherine Comly Frahm died in 1994, the house was conveyed to the Washington County Historical Association. It has been listed on the National Register of Historic Places since March 2, 2006.

References

		
National Register of Historic Places in Washington County, Nebraska
Colonial Revival architecture in Nebraska
Houses completed in 1905
1905 establishments in Nebraska